Rois sans couronne is the second studio album by French rapper Nessbeal. It was released on June 9, 2008 by Nouvelle Donne Music and Because Éditions for digital download. The album entered the French Albums Charts at number 18, where it had since peaked.

Track listing
Producer credits adapted from Discogs.

Chart performance

References

2008 albums
Nessbeal albums
Albums produced by Skread